

Squad

Staff
 Alexandre Guimarães - Head Coach
  Rodríguez - Assistant Coach
 Humaid Yousuf - Team Manager
 Luiz Carlos - Fitness Coach
 Yassin Bentaalla - Goalkeepers Coach
 Dr. Taha Al Rawy - Team Doctor
  Leonardo Sasuque - Processor
  Joseph - Masseur

Transfers

In

Out 

For Last Season's Transfers List Please visit List of AlWasl football transfers 2008 2009

Players on loan

Tournaments

Gulf Club Champions Cup 2009

The draw for the group stage of the Gulf Club Champions Cup 2009 was made on July 18, 2009 in Bahrain. AlWasl were drawn into Group D with the Kuwaiti team Kuwait SC, and the Bahraini side Riffa.

During the second leg match again Al-Nassr club of Saudi Arabia, few fans were provoked by Al Nassr's team doctor to break into the field and assault him. This incident has put Al Wasl's deserved qualification into the finals into jeopardy.

In the Final, Al Wasl played against Qatar SC and won the tournament based on the Away goals rule after drawing 2-2 in Qatar, then drawing 1-1 in Dubai.

Al Wasl FC Striker Saeed Al Kass won the Top Scorer title with 6 goals, and the Left Winger Fadel Ahmad won the Best Player title.

Group D Standing

Results

Top scorers

UAE League 2009–10

AlWasl started the League season with high hopes after the successful signings it made during summer. But the team's star, the Goalkeeper Majed Nasser risked the team's chances by getting suspension in the team's second match of the season against Al Shabab, forcing the team to play 5 matches without his very essential services.
In the Winter transfer period, Al Wasl ended the contracts of his two new foreign players Blas Pérez and Douglas dos Santos due to their failure to secure a place in the team's squad. It signed the Moroccan player Soufiane Alloudi on a loan contract.

And on 18 February 2010, The team signed Brazilian playmaker Élton.

Standing

Results

Top scorers

An own goal has also been scored for AlWasl by Al Shabab Club's player Abdullah Darwish

2009–10 UAE President's Cup

AlWasl qualified directly to the Round of 16 of the UAE President's Cup. It played against Emirates Club in Khor Fakkan in a match that looked to be an easy task but proved otherwise. Emirates Club was able to beat AlWasl 2-1 in Extra time. The main cause of the early exit from the tournament was Al Wasl's recent triumph after topping their group in the Gulf Club Champions Cup 2009 and also due to the Red Card received by defender Sami Rubaiya.

Results

Etisalat Cup 2009-10

The Etisalat Cup is a gap-filler between the official tournaments. It does not involve the International Players.

Standing

Results

Al Wasl FC played twice at Home against Emirates Club as per the opponent's request due to the construction works in the Emirates Club Stadium during the first round of the competition.

Top scorers

Facts and controversies
 Al Wasl was a part of both the two only matches ending with a goalless draw in the UAE League 2009-10 season. The First was against Al Nasr in the 16th round, and the second was against Ahli Dubai in the 18th round. Both matches were played in Al Wasl's ground in Zabeel.

See also
 Al Wasl F.C. season 2008–09
 2010–11 Al Wasl F.C. season

References

Al Wasl
2010